Sze-Tsen Hu (9 October 1914 – 6 May 1999), also known as Steve Hu, was a Chinese-American mathematician, specializing in homotopy theory.

Hu received his B.S. from the National Central University in Nanking, China in 1938 and his Ph.D. from the University of Manchester, England in 1947 with thesis advisor Max Newman.

Hu held a visiting lectureship at Tulane University for 1949–1950 and was a visiting scholar from 1950 to 1952 at the Institute for Advanced Study. He was an associate professor at Tulane University in 1952–1955, a professor in 1955–1956 at the University of Georgia, and from 1956 to the end of 1959 a professor at Wayne State University in Detroit, Michigan. In January 1960 he became a professor at UCLA, where he remained until his retirement as professor emeritus in 1982. He was an invited speaker at the International Congress of Mathematicians in 1950 at Cambridge, Massachusetts.

He was elected in 1966 to the Academica Sinica (Taiwan). He was survived by his second wife, his son, and his daughter.

Selected works

Articles

Books

References

Mathematicians from Zhejiang
20th-century American mathematicians
Topologists
1914 births
1999 deaths
Tulane University faculty
Wayne State University faculty
University of California, Los Angeles faculty
Institute for Advanced Study visiting scholars
Scientists from Huzhou
Chinese emigrants to the United States
Members of Academia Sinica
National Central University alumni
Alumni of the University of Manchester
University of Georgia faculty
Educators from Huzhou
Chinese science writers
Writers from Huzhou
People of the Republic of China